"Have a Cuppa Tea" is a song written by Ray Davies and performed by the Kinks on their 1971 album Muswell Hillbillies.

Like many Kinks songs, it is stylistically influenced by the British Music Hall. It also has a slight country influence—with the mesh of these two styles being a hallmark of the album. It is believed to be about Ray and Dave's grandmother.

The lyrics humorously celebrate the British custom of drinking tea, and the civility that comes with it. Some absurd claims are made of the drink in a tongue-in-cheek fashion, such as "It's a cure for tonsilitis and for water on the knee."  Yet the song also observes:

The lyrics also feature a parody/homage to the McGuire Sisters' 1958 hit song "Sugartime":

Though it was never a single in either the United Kingdom or the United States, it does remain a fan favourite. It was an occasional feature of the Kinks live act of the early 1970s, and was also performed live by the group on the BBC TV show The Old Grey Whistle Test in January 1972.

The song was covered by Great Big Sea for their 2010 album Safe Upon the Shore.

References

The Kinks songs
Songs written by Ray Davies
1971 songs
Song recordings produced by Ray Davies
Folk rock songs
Music hall songs